Badninish is a small crofting hamlet in Dornoch, Sutherland, Highland, Scotland.

References

Populated places in Sutherland